Racekiela is a genus of freshwater sponges in the family Spongillidae.

Species
Racekiela andina Hernandez & Barreat, 2017
Racekiela biceps (Lindenschmidt, 1950)
Racekiela cavernicola Volkmer-Ribeiro, Bichuette & de Sousa Machado, 2010
Racekiela montemflumina Carballo, Cruz-Barraza, Yanez & Gomez, 2018
Racekiela pictouensis (Potts, 1885)
Racekiela ryderi (Potts, 1882)
Racekiela sheilae (Volkmer-Ribeiro, de Rosa-Barbosa & Marques-Tavares, 1988)

References

Spongillidae